The seventh and final season of the Vietnamese television dance competition program Bước nhảy hoàn vũ featured Khánh My, Trang Pháp, Jennifer Phạm, S.T Sơn Thạch, Vũ Ngọc Anh, MLee, Lâm Khánh Chi, Hồng Quế, Khả Ngân,  Thuận Nguyễn, Minh Trung and Diệu Nhi.

Couples

Scoring charts

Bước nhảy hoàn vũ
Dance in Vietnam
2016 Vietnamese television seasons